Capetown (formerly, Gas Jet and False Cape) is a locality in Humboldt County, California.

The Gas Jet post office operated from 1868 to 1876. The name referred to escaping gas from an oil well. The False Cape post office opened in 1870, changed the name to Capetown in 1879, and closed permanently in 1937.

Capetown is the westernmost settlement in the state of California.

Climate
This region experiences warm (but not hot) and dry summers, with no average monthly temperatures above .  According to the Köppen Climate Classification system, Capetown has a warm-summer Mediterranean climate, abbreviated "Csb" on climate maps.

References

Former settlements in Humboldt County, California
Populated coastal places in California